The Vegetable Production System (Veggie) is a plant growth system developed and used by NASA in outer space environments. The purpose of Veggie is to provide a self-sufficient and sustainable food source for astronauts as well as a means of recreation and relaxation through therapeutic gardening. Veggie was designed in conjunction with ORBITEC and is currently being used aboard the International Space Station, with another Veggie module planned to be delivered to the ISS in 2017.

Overview 

Veggie is part of an overarching project concerning research of growing crops in zero gravity. Among the goals of this project are to learn about how plants grow in a weightless environment and to learn about how plants can efficiently be grown for crew use in space. Veggie was designed to be low-maintenance, using low power and having a low launch mass. Thus, Veggie provides a minorly regulated environment with minimal control over the atmosphere and temperature of the module. The successor to the Veggie project is the Advanced Plant Habitat (APH), components of which will be delivered to the International Space Station during the Cygnus CRS OA-7 and SpaceX CRS-11 missions in 2017.

in 2018 the Veggie-3 experiment was tested with plant pillows and root mats. One of the goals is to grow food for crew consumption. Crops tested at this time include cabbage, lettuce, and mizuna.

Design 

It consists of three parts: a lighting system, a bellows enclosure, and a reservoir. The lighting system regulates the amount and intensity of light plants receive, the bellows enclosure keeps the environment inside the unit separate from its surroundings, and the reservoir connects to plant pillows where the seeds grow.

Lighting system 

Veggie's lighting system consists of three different types of colored LEDs: red, blue, and green. Each color corresponds to a different light intensity that the plants will receive. Although the lighting system can be reconfigured, the following table shows the default settings and their corresponding intensities in micromoles per second per square meter.

In addition to this lighting system, Veggie also uses opaque bellows to obstruct external sources of light.

Bellows enclosure 

The bellows enclosure controls the flow and pressure of air within the container. The bellows are made from a fluorinated polymer and connected to the lighting system at its top and a baseplate at its bottom. Power and cooling is provided to the hardware that powers the bellows by ExPRESS Racks.  Although the bellows regulate air flow and air pressure, temperature and humidity are left controlled by the surrounding environment of the Veggie module.

Reservoir 

The reservoir of the Veggie module contains and provides water to the plant pillows in which plants grow. The plant pillows contain all other material such as fertilizer and seeds for the plant to grow. Seeds are oriented inside the sticky plant pillow so that their roots will grow downwards into the substrate provided by the plant pillow and that their stems will grow upwards outside of the plant pillow.

Plants grown with Veggie 

The following plants have been grown using the Vegetable Production System:
 Red romaine lettuce ("Outredgeous" var.)
 Zinnia hybrida ("Profusion" var.)
 Tokyo Bekana (Chinese cabbage)
Cabbage
Lettuce
Mizuna

Results 

In 2010, Desert Research and Technology Studies (Desert RATS) performed operational tests of the Vegetable Production System with lettuce. The three lettuce cultivars that were initially planted yielded positive results, growing and being consumed in 14 days. The Desert RATS team reported uniformly positive psychological results from the test crew. No substantial information has been released as of yet on the differences between the nutritional values of space-grown plants and earth-grown plants

As of August 2015, the Veggie system has succeeded in growing edible plants on the ISS. Further, NASA has announced plans to launch a more advanced plant growth system named Advanced Plant Habitat in 2017. No results have been recorded on the psychological benefits of the Veggie system in space.

See also 
 SVET plant growth system
 Bioastronautics
 Plants in space
 Scientific research on the International Space Station
 Space farming
 Astrobotany

References

External links 

 Vegetable Production System information at NASA.gov
 Veg-01 experiment information at NASA.gov
 Veg-03 experiment information at NASA.gov

International Space Station experiments
Botany
Destiny (ISS module)
Space
Space farming
Space-flown life
Astrobiology space missions